Mohammadreza Kaveh (born 22 July 1997) is an Iranian football player that is currently a player of
Iran national under-23 football team, and Padideh F.C. He has played in FIFA World Cup U-17 India in 2012 for Iran national team U-17. After that in 2013 FIFA World Cup U-17 in UAE 🇦🇪 he played for Iran national team (team Melli)

References

1997 births
Living people
Iranian footballers
Association football midfielders